Franz Gerhard Wegeler (22 August 1765 – 7 May 1848) was a German physician from Bonn, who, in his youth, was a close friend of composer Ludwig van Beethoven. He was the father of historian Julius Stephan Wegeler (1807-1883).

Wegeler studied medicine at the Universities of Bonn and Vienna. After completing his studies in Austria, he returned to Bonn, where he became a tenured professor of legal medicine and obstetrics (1789). In 1794, he fled Bonn during the French Revolutionary Wars, returning to Vienna, where he renewed his friendship with Beethoven. After spending two years in Vienna, he moved back to Bonn as an instructor and a general practitioner of medicine.

In 1802, he married Eleonore von Breuning, the daughter of Helene von Breuning, a former piano student and 'first love' of Beethoven. The marriage had four children. The descendants include Helena Josepha Theresia (1803-1832) and Julius Stephan Wegeler (1807-1883).

In 1807, he relocated to Koblenz, where he joined the Prussian civil service and attained several prestigious awards.

Wegeler was a Freemason; Beethoven corresponded with him on the subject of Beethoven's music (not masonic music) being used in lodge ceremonies. Beethoven offered to compose a better piece than he had heard was being used.

A distinguished physician, Wegeler is remembered for his 1838 biography of Beethoven (Biographische Notizen über Ludwig van Beethoven), being published with composer Ferdinand Ries (1784-1838) eleven years after Beethoven's death. Historians consider these memoirs to be an important and reliable source of information  regarding the life of the great composer.

References 

 This article is based on a translation of an article from the German Wikipedia.
  Beethoven and his Bonn Circle of Friends. Selected Objects from the Wegeler Collection

German biographers
Male biographers
German obstetricians
18th-century German physicians
1765 births
1848 deaths
University of Bonn alumni
Academic staff of the University of Bonn
German male non-fiction writers
German Freemasons
18th-century German male writers